Camillea is a genus of fungi in the family Xylariaceae. Collectively, the 41 species in the genus have a widespread distribution, but are especially prevalent in tropical areas. Fruit bodies of Camillea species tend to be cylindrical in shape. The genus was originally circumscribed by Swedish mycologist Elias Fries in his 1849 work Summa vegetabilium Scandinaviae.

Species

Camillea amazonica
Camillea broomeana
Camillea campinensis
Camillea coroniformis
Camillea cyclisca
Camillea deceptiva
Camillea flosculosa
Camillea fossulata
Camillea fusiformis
Camillea gigaspora
Camillea guzmanii
Camillea hainesii
Camillea heterostoma
Camillea hyalospora
Camillea labiatirima
Camillea leprieurii
Camillea luzonensis
Camillea macrospora
Camillea magnifica
Camillea malaysiensis
Camillea mexicana
Camillea mucronata
Camillea obularia
Camillea oligoporus
Camillea ovalispora
Camillea patouillardii
Camillea pila
Camillea punctidisca
Camillea punctulata
Camillea sagrana
Camillea scriblita
Camillea selangorensis
Camillea signata
Camillea stellata
Camillea texensis
Camillea unistoma
Camillea venezuelensis
Camillea verruculospora
Camillea williamsii

References

Xylariales
Sordariomycetes genera